The Calm is the fourth mixtape by the Christian hip hop group Hostyle Gospel, released by Hostyle Gospel Ministries in 2012.

Reception 
A review in Freechristmusic.com said, "Sometimes when downloading mixtapes from people you haven't heard of before you go through a lot of stuff with really bad production. This was a nice surprise it sounds great, clearly some well done production on this one."

Track listing

References 

Hostyle Gospel albums
2012 mixtape albums